Harriet Cross is a British diplomat who is the High Commissioner to Trinidad and Tobago (since September 2020).  She was Consul-General in Boston, Massachusetts from 2016 to August 2020 (succeeding Susie Kitchens) and Deputy Ambassador at the British Embassy in Yemen before that.

She was the fourth woman to manage the Boston consulate and the first consul since 1972 to represent the United Kingdom outside the European Union. While in Yemen, ongoing conflict there compelled her to organize the evacuation of the Embassy, and she subsequently spent the rest of her posting in Jeddah, Saudi Arabia.

Cross earned a master's degree in International Relations from the Fletcher School of Law & Diplomacy at Tufts University (2019, Global Master of Arts Program (GMAP)), a First Class honours degree from the University of Warwick in Politics with French and an Executive Certificate in Management & Leadership from MIT.

References

British women ambassadors
British consuls
High Commissioners of the United Kingdom to Trinidad and Tobago
The Fletcher School at Tufts University alumni
Massachusetts Institute of Technology alumni
Year of birth missing (living people)
Living people